Creative Community for Peace (CCFP) is a pro-Israel organization which works to counter antisemitism and anti-Israel sentiment in the entertainment industry.  It was founded in 2011 by David Renzer, Steve Schnur, and Ran Geffen-Lifshitz.   CCFP is opposed to the Boycott, Divestment and Sanctions (BDS) movement and the idea to create the organization came up in on a conversation about BDS. The organization claims to be apolitical, which critics questioned after it partnered with StandWithUs from 2011 through 2013.

CCFP contacts celebrities who are scheduled to perform in Israel, attempting to counter BDS lobbying for them to cancel their appearances. CCFP describes their role as supporting and informing artists and helping facilitating music being played in peaceful gatherings.  It has also released petitions and open letters.

Founding 
Creative Community for Peace was founded in 2011 by David Renzer, the former CEO of Universal Music Publishing; Steve Schnur of Electronic Arts; and Ran Geffen-Lifshitz, founder of MMG Music. The three decided to start the organization while eating breakfast at the Dan Hotel in Tel Aviv in 2011 and discussing the BDS movement. They began asking friends and coworkers in Hollywood to get involved, and reaching out to celebrities who were scheduled to play in Tel Aviv in an attempt to counter BDS lobbying for celebrities to cancel their appearances in Israel.

Views 
Creative Community for Peace is a pro-Israel organization which works to counter antisemitism and anti-Israel sentiment in the entertainment industry. They seek to get artists and performers to promote the arts as a bridge to peace.  The organization's website focuses on Israel's cultural diversity and technology, with less focus on the Israeli–Palestinian conflict.  Co-founder Steve Schnur praised the power of the arts to build bridges and bring people together.  Co-founder David Renzer claims their goal is to provide balance in dialogue. CCFP co-founder Ran Geffen-Lifshitz stated in 2014 that the sole purpose of CCFP is to assist artists and performers with navigating appearances in Israel.

Craig Balsam (co-founder of Razor & Tie Entertainment) says that CCFP doesn't try to whitewash things or claim Israel is perfect.  He says that CCFP objects to "factually incorrect, inflammatory and extreme" statements.According to Balsam, performing in Israel is an opportunity for artists to see first hand what's going on in Israel.

Co-founder Steve Schnur said in 2019 that CCFP is apolitical and non-religious. Renzer said that their vision is that through "dialogue and conversation and education" there would eventually be a peaceful resolution to the Israel/Palestine conflict. CCFP Director, Ari praised apolitical statements for peace from Rihanna and DJ Khaled who respectively said "stand[s] with humanity" and "love and light and prayers." The website describes CCFP as a group composed of members with diverse political views about how Israel can attain peace.

CCFP Director, Ari Ingel claims that misinformation is being spread online and the amplified with social media influences with no information of what's actually happening.  He believes this only seeks to inflame the situation, instead of de-escalating it. Ingel spoke about problems with Clubhouse not having any ability to monitor hate speecha and said there was a disturbing about of anti-Jewish conspiracy theories and antisemitic tropes in the rooms including "Jews running the slave trade" and "running all the banks."

The organization is opposed to Boycott, Divestment and Sanctions.  In 2013, Forward wrote that they dispute the use of the term "occupation" to describe Israel's control over the West Bank.  They take position that Israeli settlements are not an obstacle to peace and dispute claims that Israel is practicing apartheid.  CCFP believes that performers boycotting Israel is not going to create peace. CCFP claims that some artists feel harassed or even physically threatened by BDS groups.

CCFP believes that Hamas is playing a leading role in the Israel/Palestine violence.

Renzer says they seek to create multicultural experiences and events.   Renzer praises the ideas of diversity and co-existence; highlighting the idea that at DJ shows in Israel can be 50% Jews and 50% non-Jews. Renzer has also expressed support for the black community, while insisting that Louis Farrakhan distance himself from his "previous anti-Semitic comments". Ingel expressed support for the black community's fight for justice in the United States, but added that "fighting racism with antisemitism is unacceptable." In 2020, Renzer spoke of how Jews and African Americans have a long history of standing together for civil rights.  He spoke of a desire to work with the Black entertainment community to "amplify voices of reason". Ingel works with the Black-Jewish Entertainment Alliance in addition to CCFP.

Activity 

When it was founded, Creative Community for Peace began reaching out to celebrities who were scheduled to play in Tel Aviv in an attempt to counter BDS lobbying for celebrities to cancel their appearances in Israel. In 2013, Lana Melman, then director of Creative Community for Peace, said its members use their personal connections to reach out to other artists and give them "balanced information" about Israel, additionally educating them about "the artistic freedom there, and work[ing] to arrest potential cancellations". David Siegel, consul general for Israel in Los Angeles, said in 2013 that "[CCFP are] effective because they work from inside the industry."  CCFP reaches out to every major artist or performer was is going to play in Israel, and helps prepare them for the coordinated BDS campaign they're going to face.

In 2013, BDS activists organized a petition to try to convince Alicia Keys not to play in "apartheid Israel" which got 16,000 signatures. In response, CCFP board members disputed the apartheid comparison, and organized their own petition which received 18,000 signatures; Keys ended up playing in Israel.

In 2014, six weeks after the beginning of Operation Protective Edge, CCFP published a petition signed by almost 200 Hollywood figures in Billboard, The Hollywood Reporter, and Variety. The petition expressed support for Israel and criticized Hamas.  The language of the petition called for peace and expressed sadness over the loss of life on both sides, and described Hamas as a terrorist organization determined to try to destroy Israel.

In 2018, they hosted their inaugural "Ambassadors of Peace" event with more than 400 attendees. Scooter Braun who was one of the award winners said at the event "the best way we can change the world is coming together and having a dialogue with the intention that all people are good people, and I think this organization pushes for that" 

In 2019, 11,200 signed their petition expressing support the planned Eurovision Song Contest which was due to happen in Israel.  The petition said in part that BDS protesters sought to transform the competition from a spirit of togetherness to a "weapon of division". The competition went forward.

In 2019, they hosted their second "Ambassadors of Peace" event with more than 400 entertainment industry executives in attendance. Ziggy Marley was honored at the event as one of their Ambassadors. Jacqueline Saturn was also celebrated as an "Ambassador".  She said she travels to Israel yearly and "There's not a better place to witness unity than in Jerusalem". Another winner Aaron Bay-Schuck described CCFP as an organization which "understands that music is a force for change.  Bay-Schuck also added that "the BDS movement is cowardly, hypocritical and bullying in its purest form."

In 2021, more than 125 entertainment leaders,  including KISS  frontman Gene Simmons and Grammy Award-winning artist Michael Bublé, signed the CCFP's open letter, which urges peace in the Middle East and an end to inflammatory one-sided accounts. The letter was put out in the midst of a flare up in the Israel/Palestine conflict.  The letter also acknowledged the pain and loss on both sides of the conflict.

Celebrity involvement

Alicia Keys 

The BDS movement was very active in trying to get Alicia Keys not to visit Israel.  CCFP worked with her management team to help facilitate her trip.  They also connected her with an Israel musician  Idan Raichel whom they say is focused on using music as a means of peace and co-existence. Keys performed in Israel with a multi-cultural group of musicians.

Bhad Bhabie 

Danielle Bregoli also known as Bhad Bhabie made an appearance at CCFP's 2019 Ambassadors of Peace event. She posted a picture of herself at the event, tagging CCFP and captioning it "BHABIE SUPPORTS PEACE BICH".

Despite BDS protests, she went ahead with a concert in Tel Aviv.

Cyndi Lauper 

CCFP worked closely with Cyndi Lauper and team on her trip to Israel. She specifically wanted to visit an LGBTQ facility in Israel.  CCFP organized an event at Tel Aviv's LGBT Center where she met with gay activist and took questions from the crowd. Lauper praised Israel's "warmth, democracy and diversity."  Times of Israel describes the event as a "huge success for Israel advocacy".

Diane Warren 

12-time Oscar Nominee Songwriter Diane Warren is active with CCFP.  Brian Fishbach says "the arts are a vital mechanism in creating lasting change" and "Diane Warren knows what it takes to bridge divides". And Warren says "nothing can change the world like music".

Eric Burdon 

In 2013, Eric Burdon, the former frontman for The Animals cancelled a show in Tel Aviv after pressure from BDS activists. According to CCFP the BDS activism was "violent" and Burdon feared for his safety.  CCFP reached out to him, convinced him he would be safe in Israel, and went ahead with the originally planned show.

Haim Saban 

Egyptian born, media-producer Haim Saban says "The BDS movement is not only anti-Israel, but anti-Semitic".  He claims that Creative Community for Peace is the opposite of BDS, trying to bring people together instead of break them apart.  He insists there has to be a way to sit down and talk things out, and that he prays for peace for all.

Shaquille O'Neal 

CCFP released a video from Shaquille O'Neal wishing all Jews a happy Sukkot.

Ziggy Marley 

Ziggy Marley was honored as an Ambassador of Peace and a 2019 CCFP event.  At the event he said he's been going to Israel since he as a teenager.  He said he doesn't play in Israel for political reasons, he does so to "spread our message of justice, love, and peace for all people."

Awards 

In 2018, CSQ Magazine listed CCFP as part of its Philanthropy 100: LA and NY Philanthropies You Should Know

Connection to StandWithUs 
While waiting for approval of its tax-exempt status, CCFP partnered with the nonprofit organization StandWithUs (SWU) in order to be able to receive donations. According to tax experts this is a legal and common practice.

The Forward reported in 2013, that CCFP didn't have tax-exempt status yet, the partnership was ongoing, and that CCFP was additionally sharing office space with SWU.  In a press release shared in full on Billboard, CCFP explains that as a young organization CCFP cut costs sharing accounting and HR services with SWU; both groups paid their share. Critics questioned CCFP's choice to partner with a right-wing group, with Andrew Kadi of the U.S. Campaign to End Israeli Occupation asking why they would not "align themselves with an organization that is closer to their projected position as apolitical". Adalah-NY has claimed that Creative Community for Peace is a branch of StandWithUs.

The group's founders have maintained that there is no formal partnership between CCFP and SWU. David Renzer, a founder of CCFP, told The Forward that CCFP had always been independent from SWU and had "no day-to-day relationship" with the organization.

References 

2012 establishments in the United States
Non-governmental organizations involved in the Israeli–Palestinian conflict
Opposition to Boycott, Divestment and Sanctions
Zionist organizations
Israel–United States relations
Zionism in the United States